Paneth may refer to:

Fajans–Paneth–Hahn Law, chemistry rule concerning co-precipitation and adsorption
Friedrich Paneth (1887–1958), Austrian-born British chemist
Joseph Paneth (1857–1890), Austrian physiologist from Vienna
Nigel Paneth (born 1946), English epidemiologist
Paneth (crater), lunar impact crater that is located on the far side of the Moon
Paneth cell, found in the intestinal tract